Shantha Fonseka (born 28 September 1975) is a Sri Lankan former cricketer who played in three first-class and six List A matches between 1996 and 2001. He is now an umpire, and has stood in matches in the 2018–19 Premier Limited Overs Tournament.

References

External links
 

1975 births
Living people
Sri Lankan cricketers
Sri Lankan cricket umpires
Antonians Sports Club cricketers
Burgher Recreation Club cricketers
Place of birth missing (living people)